Edleston is a civil parish in Cheshire East, England.  It contains six buildings that are recorded in the National Heritage List for England as designated listed buildings, all of which are at Grade II.  This grade is the lowest of the three gradings given to listed buildings and is applied to "buildings of national importance and special interest".  The parish is entirely rural.  The Shropshire Union Canal passes through the parish, and there are three listed structures associated with this, two accommodation bridges and a milepost.  The other listed buildings are cottages and a farmhouse.

See also
Listed buildings in Acton
Listed buildings in Baddington
Listed buildings in Burland
Listed buildings in Nantwich
Listed buildings in Sound

References

Listed buildings in the Borough of Cheshire East
Lists of listed buildings in Cheshire